Sir James Graham (29 July 1856 – 8 March 1913) was a Scottish-born physician and politician, active in Australia. He was Mayor of Sydney in 1901.

Graham was born in Edinburgh, son of Thomas Graham, marble polisher, and his wife Jane ( née Square). Graham graduated M.A. at University of Edinburgh in 1879 and M.B. and C.M. in 1882. Graham migrated to Sydney in 1884  but then returned to Europe in August 1888 and studied at Berlin, Vienna and Paris. In 1888, he obtained the M.D. degree of Edinburgh Medical School with gold medal for his thesis on "Hydatid Disease in its Clinical Aspects". Returning to Sydney he was appointed superintendent of the Royal Prince Alfred Hospital which, largely by his influence, became an excellent training-ground for the medical profession. From 1897 he was lecturer in midwifery at the University of Sydney (working under Thomas Peter Anderson Stuart) and held this position until 1912. He was founder of the Surgical Appliances Aid Society, the Crown Street Women's Hospital, the Trained Nurses' Association, and was the first president of the New South Wales Dental Board.

Graham was elected a member of the New South Wales Legislative Assembly for Sydney-Belmore in 1894 and held the seat until his defeat in 1901. In 1898 he became a member of the Sydney City Council and took a prominent part in a successful reform movement. His professional knowledge was also of great use during the plague scare in 1900. Graham was Mayor of Sydney in 1901 during the visit of the Duke of York and was knighted by him. In 1906 Graham opposed Chris Watson for the federal seat of South Sydney but was defeated. At the 1907 state election, Graham was again elected to the Legislative Assembly, this time for Surry Hills but lost his seat at the 1910 election. He was for several years vice-president of the Liberal and Reformist Association, later the Liberal Association. Graham died at Sydney on 8 March 1913 and was buried in the Anglican section of Waverley Cemetery. He married in 1890 Fanny, daughter of the Rev. G. W. Millard in 1890, who survived him with a son.

References

 

1856 births
1913 deaths
Australian people of Scottish descent
Australian medical doctors
Mayors and Lord Mayors of Sydney
Alumni of the University of Edinburgh
Free Trade Party politicians
Members of the New South Wales Legislative Assembly